David Brown (active 1792 ‒ 1797) was a British landscape and genre painter.

According to Walter Gilbey, Brown was a house and sign painter who "cherished higher artistic ambitions and had set his heart on learning to painting like George Morland," a British artist famous for his animal paintings and scenes of rustic life. After selling his business, Brown studied with Morland and became one of his many imitators. Although his paintings featured a more gestural brushstroke and a heavier use of impasto, his works often passed for those of his master. Brown exhibited ten paintings at the Royal Academy between 1792 and 1797, including pasticci of Morland and views of London, which some critics have suggested are his most successful works. He supplemented his income during these years by selling paintings by Morland that he had acquired during his tenure in the artist's studio. Brown eventually became a drawing master.

Gallery

Notes

References 
Gilbey, Walter. George Morland: His Life and Works. London: Adam and Charles Black, 1907.
Grant, Maurice Harold. A Dictionary of British Landscape Painters from the 16th Century to the Early 20th Century. Leigh-on-Sea: F. Lewis Publishers, Ltd., 1952.

Year of birth missing
Year of death missing
18th-century British painters
British male painters
British genre painters
British landscape painters